Paul Burrell  (born 6 June 1958) is a former servant of the British Royal Household and latterly butler to Diana, Princess of Wales.

Background and Royal Household career
Burrell was born and raised in Grassmoor, Derbyshire, a coal-mining village. His parents were Graham Burrell and Beryl Burrell, née Kirk. His father was a lorry driver and it was initially assumed he would go to work in the local colliery, but he had decided at the age of eight that he wanted to work at Buckingham Palace. This was after a trip to London, in which he witnessed the Changing of the Guard. He attended William Rhodes Secondary School in Chesterfield before entering High Peak College in Buxton, where he studied hotel management.

Burrell entered Royal Service at age 18 as a Buckingham Palace footman, becoming the Queen Elizabeth II's personal footman a year later. He was nicknamed "Small Paul", to distinguish him from a taller footman, Paul Whybrew, who was known as "Tall Paul".

In 1987, Burrell joined the household of Charles and Diana at Highgrove House, Gloucestershire, acting as butler to the princess until her death in August 1997. Burrell said that Diana, Princess of Wales, had described him as "the only man she ever trusted". Books produced by Burrell state that Diana was very fond of him, and that she would describe him as her "rock" for his support during trying times, but Diana's mother, Frances Shand Kydd, detested him and believed that he was "just another hanger-on grasping at Diana's celebrity".

In 2001, Burrell opened a florist's in Farndon, Cheshire.

Events since the death of Diana

Royal Household and inquest related 
Burrell has been routinely mentioned in relation to Diana. At times the coverage has been adverse, for example in a 2002 case where he was charged with theft related to Diana's possessions. The trial collapsed after evidence was given that the Queen had spoken with him regarding disputed events and a public-interest immunity (PII) certificate was presented by the Crown Prosecution Service.

In January 2008 Burrell appeared as a witness at the inquest into the death of Diana. Burrell said he had approached a Catholic priest about a private marriage between Diana and the heart surgeon Hasnat Khan, and denied rumours that Diana was about to announce her engagement to Dodi Fayed. He was also questioned on a letter to him from Diana in October 1996, in which she said her husband was planning to have her killed to make the path clear for him to marry Camilla Parker Bowles. The coroner dismissed notions of a "secret" that Burrell knew about Diana that he swore he "would never reveal," as detailed at the end of his book, A Royal Duty.

Other matters were discussed in relation to the case, many alleged and not proven, including allegations of perjury at the coroner's court, and allegations about his personal life.

On 18 February 2008, The Sun newspaper reported that Burrell had admitted, on tape, that he had not told "the whole truth" during his appearance at the Diana inquest; he also said he had thrown in a "few red herrings". Some reports suggested that Burrell could be charged with perjury. The Sun said it would hand the tape to the court on 19 February 2008.

Burrell was criticised for copying Diana's letters and his integrity was called into question. The coroner, Lord Justice Scott Baker, said: "In the end, there is an important issue as to the credibility of the witness."

Memoirs
In 2003, Burrell released a memoir, A Royal Duty, which follows his career as a member of the Royal staff. It deals with his time as butler to the Prince and Princess of Wales at Highgrove House in Gloucestershire, his move to Diana's staff at Kensington Palace after her divorce from Prince Charles, and the dismissal of the theft charges against Burrell. The book was sold internationally and was updated in a paperback edition in 2004. Its publication led to a rift with Buckingham Palace. Princes William and Harry accused Burrell of betraying their mother's confidences. In a joint statement before publication, they called the book "a cold and overt betrayal."

Media career
On 21 November 2004, Burrell entered the fourth series of the ITV reality television show I'm a Celebrity...Get Me Out of Here! and finished as runner-up on 6 December 2004. He was a judge and trainer on Australian Princess in 2005, and in March 2006 appeared on Countdown in Dictionary Corner.

In early 2006, he appeared as Richard Gere on ITV's Celebrity Stars in Their Eyes, singing "Razzle Dazzle" from Chicago, the film version of the Broadway musical. A further TV appearance in September 2006 was followed by another in 2015.

In February 2017, Burrell and his house in Peckforton appeared in an episode of ITV's UK reality TV series Through the Keyhole with Keith Lemon. In August 2017, he appeared in Series 2 of the Channel 5 UK reality TV series In Therapy. In November 2017, a television documentary, Diana: The Royal Truth, for which Burrell was the primary source, was released in the UK.

Personal life
Burrell was married to Maria Cosgrove, who formerly worked for Prince Philip, Duke of Edinburgh. They met while working in Buckingham Palace and have two sons.

In 2017, a divorced Burrell announced he was marrying his male partner, Graham Cooper, a corporate lawyer whom he met ten years ago. This occurred on 2 April 2017 in Bowness-on-Windermere.

In July 2019, Burrell sold his florist shop as a going concern and retired to live with his husband in their 19th-century mock-Tudor house in Peckforton, Cheshire.

Burrell is a fan of Wrexham Football Club and St Helens Rugby Football Club. His pastimes include travelling and painting churchyard scenes.

On 30 January 2023, Burrell announced that he had been diagnosed with prostate cancer in 2022 and was receiving treatment.

Honours
He was awarded the Royal Victorian Medal in November 1997 for services to the Royal Family. He also received the Queen Elizabeth II Version of the Royal Household Long and Faithful Service Medal for 20 years service to the Royal Family.

Bibliography
Entertaining with Style (1999)
In the Royal Manner: Butler to Diana (1999)
A Royal Duty (2003)
The Way We Were: Remembering Diana (2007)

References

External links
 
 

1958 births
Living people
British male writers
British memoirists
British non-fiction writers
British butlers
Converts to Roman Catholicism
English domestic workers
Florists
Gay men
English LGBT people
Members of the British Royal Household
Members of the Household of the Prince of Wales
British monarchists
I'm a Celebrity...Get Me Out of Here! (British TV series) participants
I'm a Celebrity...Get Me Out of Here! (Australian TV series) participants
Male non-fiction writers
People from the Borough of Cheshire East
People from Grassmoor
People named in the Panama Papers
Recipients of the Royal Victorian Medal
Writers from London